This is a list of characters for Kikai Sentai Zenkaiger, a Japanese tokusatsu television drama. It is the second series in the franchise released in Japan's Reiwa Era and the 45th entry of Toei's long-running Super Sentai series produced by TV Asahi.

Some of their characters also participate in Zenkaiger'''s direct sequel, Avataro Sentai Donbrothers.

Main characters
Zenkaigers
Later in the series, the team receives assistance from the World Pirates' leader, Zocks, in their fight against Tozitend's regime and the fugitive Stacy once their fight is nearing to a close.

The Zenkaigers utilize a multipurpose  firearm for transformation, combat, or to enlarge the robot members of the team. It can also access the weapons and/or abilities of past Super Sentai heroes by scanning a Sentai Gear.

Kaito Goshikida
 is the leader and sole human member of the team. He is a cheerful young man who is usually easygoing, but dedicates himself wholeheartedly when something piques his interest. Prior to the series, his scientist parents discovered parallel worlds before they suddenly disappeared, leaving Kaito to be raised by his grandmother.

Kaito can transform into the white-colored , . While he is incapable of fighting gigantic opponents, he can initiate the Zenkai Combinations and serve as ZenkaiOh's pilot.

Like the Kikainoid Zenkaigers, he can also enlarge into  as well as transform into the jet-themed  mecha, based on Gokai Silver's mecha GouZyu Drill.

Using the  firearm, Zenkaizer can summon copies of past Super Sentai members to fight alongside him and perform the  finisher. It can also enlarge and transform into the  fighter aircraft, in which it can perform the  finisher.

During the events of the V-Cinema Avataro Sentai Donbrothers vs. Zenkaiger, using the  small mecha, he can become  clad in Goldon Momotaro's armor and cape. In this form, he wields the  katana.

Juran
 is a bold and energetic red-colored Kikainoid, as well as the oldest of the four robot members, who loves parties and enjoys being the center of attention. He is the first Kikainoid that Kaito recruits.

He can also transform into the Tyrannosaurus-themed  mecha, based on Tyranno Ranger's mecha Guardian Beast Tyrannosaurus.

Gaon
 is a passionate and eccentric yellow-colored Kikainoid who does not appreciate the company of other Kikainoids and mechanical beings despite being one of them as he is fond of organic beings. He is the second Kikainoid that Kaito recruits, joining so he can defend all humans and animals from Tozitend. After joining the Zenkaigers, Gaon becomes Colorful's chef.

He can also transform into the lion-themed  mecha, based on Gao Red's mecha Gao Lion.

Magine
 is a timid and kind pink-colored Kikainoid, as well as the only female member of the team, who enjoys studying magic and the occult. She is the third Kikainoid that Kaito recruits.

She can also transform into the dragon-themed  mecha, based on the Magirangers' mecha Magi Dragon.

Vroon
 is a clumsy and curious blue-colored Kikainoid with neat freak tendencies. He is the fourth and final Kikainoid that Kaito recruits, joining after he defects from Tozitend, where Vroon initially worked as a janitor in the Tozitend Palace and was abused by his former leaders. After joining the Zenkaigers, Vroon becomes Colorful's janitor and uses what little knowledge he managed to glean from Tozitend to help Kaito find his missing parents.

He can also transform into the dump truck-themed  mecha, based on Bouken Red's mecha GoGo Dump.

Stacy
 is Barashitara's son who is a human-Kikainoid hybrid with chūnibyō syndrome and a grudge against his father for abandoning his mother and Barashitara's 893rd wife  before she died Stacy agrees to become Izirude's test subject and use his technology to prevent the Zenkaigers from interfering with Tozitend's plans and surpass Barashitara. Amidst his battles, Stacy develops an attachment to Yatsude, who reminds him of his mother. After being defeated by the Zenkaigers and ZenkaijuOh, Izirude upgrades Stacy, arming him with new weapons and the ability to summon past red warriors in their super forms as well. Eventually however, Stacy helps the Zenkaigers in their final battle against Tozitend and kills Barashitara with Zocks' help. Following Kaito's victory over God and unsealing all of the parallel worlds, Stacy refuses the Kikainoids' offer to become their new ruler following the end of the Tozitend dynasty, but helps in Kikaitopia’s transition while occasionally visiting Colorful.

: Stacaesar's first personal giant robot, based on the Battle Fever team's mecha Battle Fever Robo. It is destroyed by TwokaiOh Ricky and Cutanner in a duel with Twokaizer.
: An upgraded model of Battle Caesar Robo with heavy emphasis on long ranged attacks while retaining its original weapons. It is destroyed by ZenkaijuOh.
: An upgraded model of Battle Caesar Robo.
It is destroyed by ZenkaijuOh.

Zocks Goldtsuiker
In pursuit of this goal, he initially clashes with the Zenkaigers due to their Sentai Gears' similarity to Toziru Gears. His equipment is based on that of the Gokaigers and developed with technology stolen from Tozitend.

He also possesses two auxiliary gears based on his younger brothers that he can use to assume two alternate forms:

In this form, he gains superhuman speed and his finisher is the  He can also enlarge and transform into the black-colored  mecha.

Sentai Gears
The  are special items that the Zenkaigers use to access their powers. Aside from their personal transformation gears, they also possess legend gears that unlock the powers of the other Super Sentai, numbered after their respective season and usually stored in either Zenkaizer's  or Twokaizer's . The Zenkaigers use abilities pertaining to the original members of each Sentai team while Twokaizer gains powers based on their additional heroes. During the final battle against Bokkowaus, the Zenkaigers' personal Sentai Gears turn into Avataro Gear-shaped Sentai Gears. In Avataro Sentai Donbrothers, the Sentai Gears are also used as part of the alternate Kaito's equipment, some of which are obtained from the destruction of a Hitotsuki. By obtaining a Sentai/Avataro Gear from the destroyed monsters, the alternate Kaito is able to share its powers with the rest of the Donbrothers to initiate Avatar Changes into past Sentai warriors.

Furthermore, Stacaesar possesses evil versions of the Sentai Gears called , which he can use to create copies of past Super Sentai members and/or mecha to fight for him. However, according to Izirude, the Dark Sentai Gears must be used sparingly or said copies will disappear from overuse. Staceasar later gains an upgrade that allows him to summon upgraded copies of the Sentai members based on their powered-up forms.

Transformation
16. Zenkai Juran: Juran's personal Sentai Gear, based on the Zyurangers' mecha Daizyuzin, that he uses to transform into Zenkai Juran and enlarge into Juran Tyranno. In Avataro Sentai Donbrothers, Zenkaizer Black uses it to summon a copy of Juran Tyrann to help Don Momotaro in facilitating the Don ZenkaiOh combination in the Noto Layer.
19. Twokai Ricky: Ricky's personal Sentai Gear, based on the Ohrangers' mecha Ohranger Robo, that Zocks uses to transform into Twokaizer Ohran Form and assemble TwokaiOh Ricky.
25. Zenkai Gaon: Gaon's personal Sentai Gear, based on the Gaorangers' mecha Gao King, that he uses to transform into Zenkai Gaon and enlarge into Gaon Lion.
29. Zenkai Magine: Magine's personal Sentai Gear, based on the Magirangers' mecha Magi King, that she uses to transform into Zenkai Magine and enlarge into Magine Dragon.
30. Zenkai Vroon: Vroon's personal Sentai Gear, based on the Boukengers' mecha DaiBouken, that he uses to transform into Zenkai Vroon and enlarge into Vroon Dump.
33. Twokai Cutanner: Cutanner's personal Sentai Gear, based on the Shinkengers' mecha ShinkenOh, that Zocks uses to transform into Twokaizer Shinken Form and assemble TwokaiOh Cutanner.
35. Twokaizer: Zocks's personal Sentai Gear, based on the Gokaigers' leader Gokai Red and their mecha GokaiOh, that he uses to transform into Twokaizer and summon CrocoDaiOh.
45. Zenkaizer: Kaito's personal Sentai Gear, based on the Gorengers' leader Akarenger and their aircraft the Varidorin, that he uses to transform into Zenkaizer and assemble ZenkaiOh.
45. : Zenkai Red's personal Sentai Gear, which is a red-colored version of the Zenkaizer Gear, that he uses to transform.
. Staecaesar: Stacy's personal Dark Sentai Gear, based on the Battle Fever team's leader Battle Japan, that he uses to transform into Stacaesar.
Z. : A special kaiju-like Sentai Gear that changes from its V-Rex-themed  to its Dragon Caesar-themed  for Zenkaizer and Twokaizer to assume their super forms.

Legend
01. : Allows the Zenkaigers to perform the Gorengers'  finisher.
02. : Arms Twokaizer with Big One's .
03. : Grants the Zenkaigers dancing-esque combat capabilities.
04. : Arms the Zenkaigers with the Denzimen's  boxing gloves.
05. : Allows the Zenkaigers to perform the Sun Vulcan team's  finisher.
06. : Allows the Zenkaigers to perform the Goggle-V team's  attack.
07. : Allows the Zenkaigers to perform either Dyna Pink's  attack or the Dynamen's  attack.
08. : Allows the Zenkaigers to perform the Biomen's  finisher.
09. : Allows a Zenkaiger to perform Change Gryphon's  attack.
10. : Allows the Zenkaigers to perform the Flashmen's  finisher.
11. : Allows the Zenkaigers to harness the Maskmen's  energy source.
12. : Arms a Zenkaiger with Red Falcon's .
13. : Grants the Zenkaigers and Twokaizer increased speed.
14. : Grants the Zenkaigers superhuman intelligence.
15. : Allows the Zenkaigers to either reenact the ending scene of Chōjin Sentai Jetmans final episode or make tomato sauce using one of Yellow Owl's tomatoes.
16. : Allows the Zenkaigers to perform the Zyurangers'  finisher.
17. : Arms the Zenkaigers with the Dairangers'  bō and/or allows them to perform Shishi Ranger's  attack. When used by Twokaizer, he is armed with Kiba Ranger's .
18. : Allows the Zenkaigers to perform the Kakurangers'  techniques.
19. : Allows the Zenkaigers to perform Twokaizer Ohran Form's Twokaizer: Super-Powered Star Knuckle.
20. : Allows a Zenkaiger to perform Yellow Racer's  attack.
21. : Allows the Zenkaigers to convert a flat surface into a hoverboard.
22. : Grants Twokaizer bull taming capabilities.
23. : Grants the Zenkaigers knowledge in rescue operations.
24. : Grants the Zenkaigers limited chronokinesis.
25. : Grants the Zenkaigers animalistic fighting instincts.
26. : Allows the Zenkaigers to perform the Hurricanegers'  attack. When used by Twokaizer, he is armed with Shurikenger's  katana.
27. : Arms Twokaizer with Abare Killer's  short sword.
28. : Arms the Zenkaigers with the Dekarangers'  handcuffs.
29. : Arms the Zenkaigers with the Magirangers'  wand.
31. : Arms Twokaizer with Geki Chopper's  gauntlet.
32. : Allows Twokaizer to perform the Go-on Wings'  attack.
33. : Allows the Zenkaigers to either perform Twokaizer Shinken Form's Thrilling Slash: True Sword Flash or harness the Shinkengers'  energy source.
34. : Allows the Zenkaigers to perform the Goseigers' . When used by Twokaizer, he gains the ability to transform into Gosei Knight's  form.
35. : Allows the Zenkaigers to switch weapons.
36. : Allows the Zenkaigers to gain the Go-Busters'  abilities.
37. : Grants the Zenkaigers a samba-esque fighting style.
38. : Allows the Zenkaigers to perform a train-like linked attack.
39. : Allows the Zenkaigers to perform the Ninningers'  finisher.
40. : Allows a Zenkaiger to gain Zyuoh Eagle's  ability. When used by Twokaizer, he is armed with Zyuoh The World's  sidearm.
41. : Allows a Zenkaiger to gain Shishi Red's extra luck.
42. : Allows the Zenkaigers to perform the Lupinrangers'  finisher. Used exclusively in the web-exclusive series Kikai Sentai Zenkaiger Spin-Off: Zenkai Red Great Introduction!.
42. : Allows the Zenkaigers to either perform the Patrangers'  finisher or harness Patren Ugou's fusion ability to bring multiple targets together. Zenkai Red uses a special  version of this Sentai Gear in the web-exclusive series Kikai Sentai Zenkaiger Spin-Off: Zenkai Red Great Introduction!.
43. : Arms the Zenkaigers with the Ryusoulgers'  sidearm.
44. : Allows the Zenkaigers to either summon small drone versions of the Kiramagers'  mecha for combat assistance or create confetti sparkles.
46. : An Avataro Gear-shaped Sentai Gear given to Kaito by Isao that allows the Zenkaigers to summon Don Momotaro.

Special
: Allows the Zenkaigers to summon all Red warriors from Himitsu Sentai Gorenger to Mashin Sentai Kiramager. Used exclusively in the film Kikai Sentai Zenkaiger the Movie: Red Battle! All Sentai Great Assemble!!. : Allows the Zenkaigers to raise a death flag for the target. Used exclusively in the crossover film Saber + Zenkaiger: Super Hero Senki.
: An alternate version of the Zenkaiju Gear that allows Zenkaizer and Twokaizer to assume their Kirameki forms. Used exclusively in the V-Cinema Kikai Sentai Zenkaiger vs. Kiramager vs. Senpaiger.

Rider
The  are three special one-use-only gears created by Flint, inspired by the World Pirates' travels around the Kamen Riders' worlds.
01. : Allows a Zenkaiger to perform Kamen Rider Zero-One's  finisher.
02. : Arms a Zenkaiger with Kamen Rider Saber's  knightly sword.
20. : Allows a Zenkaiger to gain Kamen Rider Zi-O II's precognitive sight.

ZenkaiOh
 is the name given to the giant robots formed by two of the Zenkaiger mecha via .
: A combination of Juran Tyranno and Gaon Lion.
: A combination of Juran Tyranno and Magine Dragon.
: A combination of Vroon Dump and Magine Dragon.
: A combination of Vroon Dump and Gaon Lion.
: A combination of Giant Super Zenkaizer and Juran Tyranno.
: A combination of Juran Tyranno and Don Momotaro's  via . It also appears in Avataro Sentai Donbrothers, piloted by Don Momotaro.

TwokaiOh
 is Twokaizer's personal giant robot formed by CrocoDaiOh, Twokai Cutanner, and Twokai Ricky via  that can assume one of two forms:
: A red/gold-colored configuration that is equipped with the left arm-mounted .
: A blue/silver-colored configuration that is equipped with the right arm-mounted .

Additionally, CrocoDaiOh can either split into the  hovercraft and the  motorcycle, piloted by Twokai Cutanner and Twokai Ricky respectively, or transform into the  cannon.

Super TwokaiOh
 is a giant robot formed by Super Twokaizer SD, CrocoDaiOh, and Twokai Ricky. It is armed with both the Zenkai Tenlance and the Cutanner Tou.

ZenkaijuOh
 is a kaiju-themed giant robot formed by Giant Super Zenkaizer and Super Twokaizer SD via . Its design is an amalgamation of Dragon Caesar from Zyuranger and the V-Rex from Timeranger.

Zenryoku ZenkaiOh
 is the Zenkaigers' ultimate giant robot, formed by the Zenryoku Eagle, Juran Tyranno, Gaon Lion, Magine Dragon, and Vroon Dump via .
: A special version of Zenryoku ZenkaiOh. It appears exclusively in the V-Cinema Kikai Sentai Zenkaiger vs. Kiramager vs. Senpaiger.

Recurring characters
Goshikida Family
The family consist of Yatsude Goshikida; her son, Isao Goshikida; his wife, Mitsuko Goshikida; and their son, Kaito Goshikida. Isao and Mitsuko disappeared ten years ago when Kaito was in grade school, leaving him alone with Yatsude. When Tozitend launched their invasion, Kaito discovers his parents' secret lab in Colorful's basement, which later becomes the Zenkaigers' base of operations.

Yatsude Goshikida
 is Kaito's paternal grandmother and the owner of Colorful. Following her son and daughter-in-law's disappearances, Yatsude raised Kaito by herself.

Secchan
 is a mechanical bird created by Kaito's parents for him. When Tozitend launched their invasion, he starts to speak and becomes the Zenkaigers' guide, making use of his vast knowledge on the Super Sentai to assist them.

Isao Goshikida
 is a scientist, Kaito's father, and Yatsude's son. At some point after discovering parallel worlds and creating the Zenkaigers' equipment using the Super Sentai as inspiration, Isao and his wife Mitsuko were abducted and placed in suspended animation by Tozitend for their multiversal conquest. Hakaizer battles the Zenkaigers on several occasions before Kaito eventually succeeds in freeing Isao from Tozitend's control. Following this, Isao researches the World Pirates' technology, modifies a car so it can travel through the multiverse, and departs to look for Mitsuko, eventually finding her in Sushitopia and bringing her back home.

As Hakaizer, Isao wears a suit of armor which Izirude created through stolen data on Zenkaizer's prototype from Isao and Mitsuko's memories. Hakaizer's arms are equipped with the  guns, which allow him to perform the  finisher. Due to significant energy consumption, the Hakaizer suit cannot remain in the battlefield for extended periods of time and has to be returned to the Tozitend Palace to recharge or else Isao's brainwashing will be undone. Izirude later upgrades Hakaizer to the caped  and gives him a kaiju-themed mecha called , the latter of which is destroyed by ZenkaijuOh and the CrocoDai Bazooka.

Mitsuko Goshikida
 is a scientist and Kaito's mother. She disappeared alongside her husband after discovering parallel worlds and creating the Zenkaigers' equipment. Stacy later discovers that she and her husband are in Izirude's custody and helps her escape out of sympathy for Yatsude. Taking refuge in Sushitopia, Mitsuko is later rescued by Isao, who brings her back to Earth.

Tozitend
The  is an evil dynasty that has ruled Kikaitopia through force and tyranny from their  and use  to seal parallel worlds in them. However, after sealing dozens of worlds, including those pertaining to the other Super Sentai, Kikaitopia was mysteriously fused with Kaito's homeworld, preventing them from sealing it and forcing them to deploy their forces to conquer it instead. Following the defeat of its leadership, the remaining Tozitend members are arrested by the Kikaitopians.

Bokkowaus
 is a giant robot, the current leader of Tozitend, and king of Kikaitopia who seeks to take over all parallel worlds and initially possesses a wall-like form after augmenting himself with his predecessors' remains. After numerous defeats, Bokkowaus grows tired of the Zenkaigers and upgrades himself into a humanoid form with Tozitend's remaining Toziru Gears, gaining access to the previous Super Sentai teams' arsenal. However, his plan backfires when the Super Sentai's powers escape from his body and empower the Zenkaigers' Sentai Gears, allowing them to destroy him for good while releasing all of the worlds in his possession.

Barashitara
 is the field commander of Tozitend and Stacy's father. Barashitara is destroyed by Super Twokaizer and Stacaesar.

Izirude
 is the prideful technical officer of Tozitend who is popular in Kikaitopia for his intelligence. In reality, most of Izirude's inventions, such as the Toziru Gears, Stacy's Geartozinger, Hakaizer, and the Zenryoku Zenkai Cannon, are counterfeits based on data taken from the kidnapped Goshikida scientists' memories, Due to his nature, Izirude is driven to kill his own peers in order to cover up his mistakes and keep his secrets. While defending the Tozitend Palace from the Zenkaigers, Izirude is killed in the explosion of his personal giant robot.

Izirude is armed with the reach extender-like  staff, which allows him to unleash a bolt of lightning towards his targets. It is destroyed by ZenkaiOh JuraGaon and ZenkaiOh VrooMagine.

Gege
 is Bokkowaus' giant mechanical bird aide that sits on his shoulder. While his suggestions usually earn Bokkowaus' favor, Gege tends to act and scheme behind Tozitend's back due to being controlled by a being claiming to be God. As a result, this eventually leads to Bokkowaus destroying Gege.

After Suzuki stepped out of the role following reports of misconduct, his role as Gege is replaced by  since episode 25.

Foot soldiers
: Tozitend's regular foot soldiers who were modified from Kikainoids conscripted into their military are armed with the power plug-like two-pronged  spears.
: Promoted Kudakks who are also armed with Plug Lancers.
: Tozitend's giant highest-ranking foot soldiers and promoted Kudaiters who are armed with  visors that can fire beams.
: Upgraded Kudaitests who can enlarge to 300 meters by fully charging up their Toziru Energy and are equipped with the arm-mounted  blades.

Worlds
The  are Tozitend's monsters created by infusing a Kudakk with a Toziru Gear. While they are empowered, a World can gradually alter their surroundings to reflect the parallel world sealed within their Toziru Gear. 
He is destroyed by Zenkaizer and Zenkai Gaon.
He is destroyed by Zenkaizer, Zenkai Juran, Zenkai Gaon, and Zenkai Magine.
He is destroyed by the Zenkaigers.
He is destroyed by Zenkaizer and Zenkai Juran.
He is destroyed by the Zenkaigers.
He is destroyed by Stacaesar.
He is destroyed by Twokaizer.
He is destroyed by Twokaizer.
He is destroyed by the Zenkaigers.
He is destroyed by the Zenkaigers.
He is destroyed by Twokaizer.
He is destroyed by the Kikainoid Zenkaigers.
He is destroyed by Zenkaizer.
He is destroyed by the Zenkaigers.
He is destroyed by Zenkaizer and Twokaizer.
He is destroyed by Super Zenkaizer.
He is destroyed by Super Twokaizer and Kamen Rider Durendal.
He is destroyed by the Kikainoid Zenkaigers.
He is destroyed by Super Zenkaizer and Super Twokaizer.
He is destroyed by Barashitara, who was infuriated that the World affected his subordinates despite him overwhelming the Zenkaigers.
He is destroyed by the Zenkaigers.
He is destroyed by Twokaizer.
He is destroyed by the Zenkaigers.
He is destroyed by Zenkaizer.
He is destroyed by the Zenkaigers.
He is destroyed by Zenkaizer and Stacaesar.
He is destroyed by the Zenkaigers.
He is destroyed by the Zenkaigers.
He is destroyed by Super Twokaizer.
He is destroyed by the Kikainoid Zenkaigers.
He is destroyed by Super Zenkaizer, Zenkai Juran, and Zenkai Gaon.
He is destroyed by Zenkai Gaon, Zenkai Magine, and Zenkai Vroon.
He is destroyed by the Zenkaigers and Super Twokaizer.
He is destroyed by the Zenkaigers and Super Twokaizer.
He is destroyed by Zenkai Juran.
He is destroyed by the Zenkaigers.
He is destroyed by Twokaizer.
He is destroyed by Zenkai Magine.
He is destroyed by the Zenkaigers.
He is destroyed by Super Zenkaizer.
He is destroyed by the Zenkaigers.

Other Worlds
: A special World whose body is an amalgamation of parts based on the main villains of all previous Super Sentai series. He is destroyed by the Zenkaigers. This World appears exclusively in the film Kikai Sentai Zenkaiger the Movie: Red Battle!
: A weaker version of Super Warumono World. Though he is defeated by Zenkaizer and Zenkai Red, he enlarges before being destroyed by ZenkaiOh JuraGaon. This World appears exclusively in the web-exclusive series Kikai Sentai Zenkaiger Spin-Off: Zenkai Red Great Introduction! and is also voiced by Tomokazu Seki.
He is left behind and replaced by his Kudaitest counterpart. This World appears exclusively in Kikai Sentai Zenkaiger: Secret Zenkai File Ep. 2.
He is left behind and replaced by his Kudaitest counterpart. This World appears exclusively in Kikai Sentai Zenkaiger: Secret Zenkai File Ep. 3.
He is defeated by Twokaizer alongside Taiyou World. This World appears exclusively in Kikai Sentai Zenkaiger: Secret Zenkai File Ep. 4.
He is defeated by Twokaizer alongside Sakuramochi World. This World appears exclusively in Kikai Sentai Zenkaiger: Secret Zenkai File Ep. 4.
He is destroyed by Twokaizer and Kamen Rider Saber. This World appears exclusively in a special episode of Kamen Rider Saber and is voiced by Sōichirō Hoshi.
: A Kamen Rider Saber-themed special World that Asmodeus created to serve him. He is destroyed by Kamen Riders 1 and Blades.
He is left behind and replaced by his Kudaitest counterpart. This World appears exclusively in Kikai Sentai Zenkaiger: Secret Zenkai File Ep. 5.
He is destroyed by the Zenkaigers, Kirameki Twokaizer, Stacaesar, and the Kiramagers alongside Dr. Iokaru.

Dai Worlds
The  are Tozitend's giant monsters created when a Kudaitest or a New Kudaitest absorbs a World's Toziru Gear after the monster is destroyed. Like their smaller counterparts, Dai Worlds can greatly alter their surroundings to reflect the parallel world sealed within their Toziru Gear. Once the Toziru Gear is destroyed, the parallel world sealed within it is set free.
: A mushroom-themed giant monster with the power of the Kinoko Toziru Gear. He is destroyed by ZenkaiOh JuraGaon.
: An ice-themed giant monster with the power of the Koori Toziru Gear. He is destroyed by ZenkaiOh JuraGaon.
: A boxing-themed giant monster with the power of the Boxing Toziru Gear. He is destroyed by ZenkaiOh VrooMagine.
: A sushi-themed giant monster with the power of the Sushi Toziru Gear. He is destroyed by ZenkaiOh JuraGaon and ZenkaiOh VrooMagine.
: A garbage-themed giant monster with the power of the Gomi Toziru Gear. He is destroyed by ZenkaiOh VrooMagine.
: A door-themed giant monster with the power of the Door Toziru Gear. He is destroyed by ZenkaiOh JuraGaon and ZenkaiOh VrooMagine.
: A kashiwa mochi-themed giant monster with the power of the Kashiwamochi Toziru Gear. He is destroyed by ZenkaiOh JuraGaon.
: A daytime-themed giant monster with the power of the Mahiru Toziru Gear. He is destroyed by ZenkaiOh VrooMagine.
: A tag-themed giant monster with the power of the Onigokko Toziru Gear. He is destroyed by his bomb.
: A snail-themed giant monster with the power of the Katatsumuri Toziru Gear. He is destroyed by TwokaiOh Cutanner.
: A recycling-themed giant monster with the power of the Recycle Toziru Gear. He is destroyed by Battle Caesar Robo.
: A retro style-themed giant monster with the power of the Retro Toziru Gear. He is destroyed by ZenkaiOh JuraGaon and TwokaiOh Cutanner.
: A magnet-themed giant monster with the power of the Jishaku Toziru Gear. He is destroyed by the enlarged Kikainoid Zenkaigers.
: A transparency-themed giant monster with the power of the Toumei Toziru Gear. He is destroyed by TwokaiOh Ricky.
: A falling in love-themed giant monster with the power of the Renai Toziru Gear. He is destroyed by ZenkaiOh JuraGaon, ZenkaiOh VrooMagine, and TwokaiOh Cutanner.
: A rhinoceros beetle-themed giant monster with the power of the Kabutomushi Toziru Gear. He is destroyed by ZenkaiOh JuraGaon and ZenkaiOh VrooMagine.
: A cowherd-themed giant monster with the power of the Hikoboshi Toziru Gear. He is destroyed by ZenkaiOh VrooMagine and TwokaiOh Cutanner.
: A copying-themed giant monster with the power of the Copy Toziru Gear. He is destroyed by ZenkaijuOh.
: A bullfighting-themed giant monster with the power of the Tougyu Toziru Gear. He is destroyed by ZenkaijuOh.
: A vacation-themed giant monster with the power of the Vacances Toziru Gear. He is destroyed by ZenkaijuOh.
: A manga-themed giant monster with the power of the Manga Toziru Gear. He is destroyed by ZenkaijuOh.
: A tennis-themed giant monster with the power of the Tennis Toziru Gear. He is destroyed by ZenkaiOh VrooMagine.
: A persimmon-themed giant monster with the power of the Hoshigaki Toziru Gear. He is destroyed by ZenkaijuOh.
: A cow's milk-themed giant monster with the power of the Gyunyu Toziru Gear. He is destroyed by the Zenryoku Eagle.
: An inversion-themed giant monster with the power of the Sakasama Toziru Gear. He is destroyed by Zenryoku ZenkaiOh.
: A school-themed giant monster with the power of the Gakuen Toziru Gear. He is destroyed by ZenkaiOh VrooMagine and ZenkaijuOh.
: A Halloween-themed giant monster with the power of the Halloween Toziru Gear. He is destroyed by ZenkaijuOh.
: A diamond-themed giant monster with the power of the Dia Toziru Gear. He is destroyed by Zenryoku ZenkaiOh.
: A jack-in-the-box-themed giant monster with the power of the Bikkuribako Toziru Gear. He is destroyed by ZenkaijuOh.
: A daikon-themed giant monster with the power of the Daikon Toziru Gear. He is destroyed by Zenryoku ZenkaiOh.
: A Bon Festival-themed giant monster with the power of the Bon Toziru Gear. He is destroyed by ZenkaijuOh.
: A Japanese New Year-themed giant monster with the power of the Shougatsu Toziru Gear. He is destroyed by ZenkaiOh JuraGaon, ZenkaiOh VrooMagine, and TwokaiOh Cutanner.
: A noodle-themed giant monster with the power of the Men Toziru Gear. He is destroyed by his noodles.
: A kotatsu-themed giant monster with the power of the Kotatsu Toziru Gear. He is destroyed by Don ZenkaiOh.
: A headwind-themed giant monster with the power of the Mukaikaze Toziru Gear. He is destroyed by TwokaiOh Ricky.
: A SD-themed giant monster with the power of the SD Toziru Gear. He is destroyed by the enlarged Twokai Cutanner and Twokai Ricky.
: An omikuji-themed giant monster with the power of the Omikuji Toziru Gear. He is reverted into a Kudaitest by Gege and destroyed by Giant Super Zenkaizer and ZenkaiOh JuraGaon.
: A carrot-themed giant monster with the power of the Ninjin Toziru Gear. He is destroyed by ZenkaiOh JuraGaon.
: A sapphire-themed giant monster with the power of the Sapphire Toziru Gear. He is destroyed by Giant Super Zenkaizer.
: A bat-themed giant monster with the power of the Koumori Toziru Gear. He is destroyed by ZenkaiOh VrooMagine.

Other Dai Worlds
: A kickboxing-themed giant monster with the power of the Kickboxing Toziru Gear. He is destroyed by ZenkaiOh JuraGaon. He appears exclusively in Kikai Sentai Zenkaiger: Secret Zenkai File Ep. 2.
: A machine press-themed giant monster with the power of the Presski Toziru Gear. He is destroyed by ZenkaiOh JuraGaon and ZenkaiOh VrooMagine. He appears exclusively in Kikai Sentai Zenkaiger: Secret Zenkai File Ep. 3.
: A phantom thief-themed giant monster with the power of the Kaitou Toziru Gear. He is destroyed by ZenkaijuOh. He appears exclusively in Kikai Sentai Zenkaiger: Secret Zenkai File Ep. 5.
: A galbi-themed giant monster with the power of the Kalbi Toziru Gear. He is destroyed by Kirameki Zenryoku ZenkaiOh. He appears exclusively in the V-Cinema Kikai Sentai Zenkaiger vs. Kiramager vs. Senpaiger.

Goldtsuiker Family
The Goldtsuiker Family are Zocks' siblings who, like him, were inspired by stories of the Gokaigers to become World Pirates and support him in his quest to find the SD Toziru Gear.

Flint Goldtsuiker
 is Zocks' younger sister. She is well-versed in gear technology, having created the Geardlinger through reverse-engineering of Tozitend's equipment while replicating the Zenkaigers' Sentai Gears for Zocks' own use. During the events of the web-exclusive special Twokaizer × Gokaiger: The Tanuki-Charmed June Bride, she uses Gai Ikari's Gokai Cellular in conjunction with the Twokaizer Ranger Key, which was temporarily created from the Twokaizer Sentai Gear, to transform into Twokaizer.

Twokai Cutanner and Twokai Ricky
After SDtopia was sealed within a Toziru Gear, Cutanner and Ricky accompany their siblings in their quest to find it. Both can fuse with Twokaizer to give him extra abilities, and like the Kikainoid Zenkaigers, they can be enlarged by their brother to assist him in battle. Following Kaito's victory over God, Flint devises a way for them to freely alternate between their human and SD forms.

God
A mysterious entity who claims to be God and the creator of the multiverse. Believing he had too many worlds to care for, he possesses Gege to manipulate Tozitend into sealing them for him and bring them under his control. Amidst this, he later takes an interest in Stacy, possessing his body to meet the Zenkaigers while displaying his ability to release or destroy parallel worlds contained in the Toziru Gears. He helps the Zenkaigers destroy Tozitend before possessing Kaito and sealing all of the dimensions. But Kaito breaks free and eventually defeats God in a Rock Paper Scissors match, with the being accepting his loss and allows Kaito to unseal the worlds.

Guest characters
: An assassin-class fencer of the Sword of Logos who can transform into  and hails from the World of Saber. After Zocks comes to her world and steals her brother Ryoga's Wonder Ride Book, the Shindais pursue the pirate to the Zenkaigers' world, where Hikoboshi World kidnaps her. Reika joins forces with Magine and their fellow captives to escape before rejoining their allies and returning to her own world with Ryoga.
: A paladin of the Sword of Logos who can transform into  and also hails from the World of Saber. After Zocks comes to his world and steals his Wonder Ride Book, he and his sister Reika pursue the pirate to the Zenkaigers' World, only to join forces with him and the Zenkaigers to defeat Hikoboshi World. After earning Zocks' respect, Ryoga regains his Wonder Ride Book and returns to his world with Reika.
: The leader of the 46th Super Sentai, the Donbrothers. Using the Donbrothers Sentai Gear, Kaito summons him to help Juran defeat Kotatsu World and Dai Kotatsu World.

Spin-off exclusive characters
Zenkai Red
 is a mysterious man who wants to replace Kaito as the Zenkaigers' leader. He was given a Geartlinger and Sentai Gear by Normal Warumono World, who sought to use him as a pawn in an attempt to break up the Zenkaigers. After helping them defeat Normal Warumono World, Zenkai Red tells the Zenkaigers he will reveal his real name once he becomes their leader before leaving. He appears exclusively in the web-exclusive series Kikai Sentai Zenkaiger Spin-Off: Zenkai Red Great Introduction!.

Unlike the other Zenkaigers, he is capable of generating an energy bayonet from his Geartlinger, though he is over-reliant on his powers in combat due to being physically weaker than them.

Pottodeus
 is a lonely and timid Kikainoid who is tricked by Dr. Iokaru into believing he is the son of Bokkowaus and appears exclusively in the V-Cinema Kikai Sentai Zenkaiger vs. Kiramager vs. Senpaiger. Pottodeus intends to become the new ruler of Tozitend until Iokaru betrays him. Following Iokaru's defeat, Stacy gives Pottodeus a chance to atone for his deeds.

Dr. Iokaru
 is a scientist from the parallel world of  who plans to dominate all of the parallel worlds with the power of the four Kanaema Stones and appears exclusively in the V-Cinema Kikai Sentai Zenkaiger vs. Kiramager vs. Senpaiger. As part of his plan, he uses Pottodeus as a figurehead for Tozitend while posing as his ally and creates gears based on Toziru Gears. After betraying Pottodeus, Iokaru is destroyed by the Zenkaigers, Kirameki Twokaizer, Stacaesar, and the Kiramagers alongside Kalbi World.

Doetamu
 is a jeweler from the parallel world of  who appears exclusively in the web-exclusive series Twokaizer × Gokaiger: The Tanuki-Charmed June Bride''. He brainwashes female pirates into becoming his wives until he is destroyed by Flint as Twokaizer and Gokai Pink.

Notes

References

Bibliography

Super Sentai characters
, Kikai Sentai Zenkaiger